The following is a timeline of the history of the city of Rio de Janeiro, Brazil.

Prior to 19th century

 1565 AD
 São Sebastião do Rio de Janeiro founded by Portuguese.
 Fortaleza de São João built.
 1603 - St James of Mercy Fort built.
 1663 - Padre Eterno galleon launched.
 1693 - Calaboose Prison built.
 1736 -  founded.
 1743 - Paço Imperial built.
 1750 - Carioca Aqueduct built.
 1752 -  founded.
 1763 - Portuguese America administrative center moved to Rio de Janeiro from Salvador.
 1770 - Old Cathedral of Rio de Janeiro consecrated.
 1783 - Passeio Público constructed.
 1792 - Real Academia de Artilharia, Fortificação e Desenho founded.

19th century

 1803 - Paço de São Cristóvão building erected.
 1808
 City becomes capital of Kingdom of Portugal.
  (royal printing press) begins operating.
 10 September: Gazeta do Rio newspaper begins publication.
 1811 - Candelária Church inaugurated.
 1811 - Construction of Valongo Wharf started.
 1815 - City becomes capital of United Kingdom of Portugal, Brazil and the Algarves
 1818 - Royal Museum established.
 1822
 City becomes capital of independent Brazil.
 Rio de Janeiro Botanical Garden opens.
 1826 -  founded.
 1827
 Jornal do Commercio newspaper in publication.
  founded in Rio.
 1838 - Instituto Histórico e Geográfico Brasileiro headquartered in Rio.
 1852 - Theatro Provisório built.
 1854 - Catete Palace built.
 1858
 Dom Pedro II railway begins operating.
 Central do Brasil inaugurated.
 1871 - Theatro D. Pedro II (theatre) inaugurated.
 1872 - Population: 274,972.
 1877 - Santa Teresa Tram opens.
 1884 - Corcovado Rack Railway opens.
 1891 - Jornal do Brasil newspaper begins publication.
1894 - Confeitaria Colombo (coffee house) opens.
 1896 - Academia Brasileira de Letras founded.

20th century

1900s-1940s
 1902 - Universidade Cândido Mendes founded.
 1904
 Vaccine Revolt.
 Avenida Rio Branco constructed.
 1906 - Palácio Monroe erected.
 1908
 City flag design adopted.
 Exhibition of the centenary of the opening of the Ports of Brazil held in Urca.
 7 April:  headquartered in city.
 1909 - Teatro Municipal (theatre) inaugurated.
 1912
 Afonsos Air Force Base built.
 Civil Police Museum founded.
 1914 - Fort Copacabana built.
 1917 - Labor strike.
 1919 - South American Championship held.
 1920 - Federal University of Rio de Janeiro founded.
 1922
 July: Coup attempt.
 National Historical Museum (Brazil) created.
 Population: 1,130,000.
 Hotel Glória built.
 Morro do Castelo (Castle Hill) demolished—now Castelo neighborhood.
 1923 - Copacabana Palace Hotel inaugurated.
 1925 - O Globo newspaper begins publication.
 1926 - Hipódromo da Gávea built.
 1927 - Edificio do Jornal A Noite built.
 1931
 Pedro Ernesto Baptista becomes mayor.
 Cristo Redentor statue built.
 1936
 Bartolomeu de Gusmão Airport inaugurated.
 Manguinhos Airport opens.
 Santos Dumont Airport inaugurated.
 1937 - Universidade Santa Úrsula founded.
 1938 - Museu Nacional de Belas Artes inaugurated.
 1940 - Pontifical Catholic University of Rio de Janeiro founded.
 1943
 Gustavo Capanema Palace built.
 Santa Cruz Air Force Base established.
 1945 - Zoological Garden inaugurated.
 1947 - South American Basketball Championship held.
 1949 -  newspaper begins publication.

1950s-1990s

 1950
 Rio de Janeiro State University established.
 Maracanã (stadium) opens.
 Population: 2,303,063.
 1951 - Nova Iguaçu level crossing disaster.
 1952
 Instituto Nacional de Matemática Pura e Aplicada established.
 Escola Brasileira de Administração Pública e de Empresas founded.
 Manchete (magazine) headquartered in city.
 1953 - Museu do Índio created.
 1954 - Ginásio do Maracanãzinho built.
 1958 - Train crash.
 1960
 Brazilian capital moved from Rio to Brasília.
 Rio becomes Guanabara State, smallest state of Brazil.
 1961
 Tijuca Forest becomes a national park.
 Edificio Avenida Central built.
 1964 - Museum of Modern Art built.
 1965
 Rede Globo television begins broadcasting.
 Flamengo Park created.
 Banda de Ipanema begins.
 1968 - March of the One Hundred Thousand against the military dictatorship happened.
 1970 - Population: 4,252,009.
 1971
 Jacarepaguá Airport opens.
 Faculdades Integradas Hélio Alonso founded.
 1972
 Petrobras Headquarters built.
 Hotel Horsa Nacional built.
 1975
 City becomes capital of Rio de Janeiro (state).
 Marcos Tamoio becomes mayor.
 Escola de Artes Visuais do Parque Lage created.
 1976 - Le Méridien Copacabana opens.
 1977
 Riocentro built.
 Rio Othon Palace hotel opens.
 1978 - Autódromo Internacional Nelson Piquet built.
 1979
 Rio de Janeiro Metro founded.
 Israel Klabin becomes mayor.
 Universidade Federal do Estado do Rio de Janeiro established.
 Rio de Janeiro Cathedral built.
 1980
 Júlio Coutinho becomes mayor.
 105 Lélio Gama St. built.
 1981 - Barra Shopping opens.
 1982 - Rio Sul Center built.
 1983
 Rede Manchete television begins broadcasting.
 Jamil Haddad becomes mayor, succeeded by Marcello Alencar.
 1984
 Sambadrome Marquês de Sapucaí built.
 CasaShopping opens.
 1985 - City joins the newly formed .
 1986 - Roberto Saturnino Braga becomes mayor.
 1988 - Jó Antônio Resende becomes mayor.
 1989
 16 July: 1989 Copa América football tournament held.
 Marcello Alencar becomes mayor.
 Centro Cultural Banco do Brasil (Rio branch) opens.
 1990
 Eva Klabin Foundation museum established.
 Escadaria Selarón construction begins.
 1991 - Population: 5,473,909.
 1992 - United Nations Conference on Environment and Development (Earth Summit) held.
 1993
 César Maia becomes mayor.
 Candelária massacre.
 Population: 5,547,033 (estimate).
 1994 Metropolitan hall opens.
 1995 - Centro Empresarial Internacional Rio built.
 1997
 Luiz Paulo Conde becomes mayor.
 Miécimo da Silva Sports Complex opens.
 1998
 Terra Encantada opens.
 Project Morrinho begins.
 Palace II building collapses.
 2000 - 2000 Ibero-American Championships in Athletics held.

21st century

 2001 - César Maia becomes mayor.
 2002 - Instituto Superior de Tecnologia em Ciências da Computação do Rio de Janeiro established.
 2004 - Torre Almirante built.
 2006 - Koni Store founded.
 2007
 Cantagalo Station opens.
 Estádio Olímpico João Havelange built.
 HSBC Arena (Rio de Janeiro) opens.
 2007 Pan American Games held.
 Rio de Janeiro train collision.
 2008 - Rio International Open Jiu-Jitsu Championship begins.
 2009
 Eduardo Paes becomes mayor.
 City wins the 2016 Olympics and Paralympics bid.
 2010
 World Urban Forum and Homeless World Cup football contest held.
 Manguinhos Library Park opens in Benfica.
 Population: 6,320,446.
 2011
 Cidade das Artes built.
 School shooting.
 2012
 25 January: Building collapses.
 6 June: TransOeste bus inaugurated.
 20–22 June: United Nations Conference on Sustainable Development held.
 7 October:  held.
 2013 - Protest.
 2014 - 2014 FIFA World Cup and Street Child World Cup football contest held.
 2015 
 July: Uber protest.
 December: Museum of Tomorrow opens.
 2016
 Olympic Games and Paralympic Games held.
 2 October:  held.
 6 October: Rio de Janeiro International Film Festival
 14 October: Ultra Brasil (electronic music festival)
 25 October: Anima Mundi (animation film festival)
 2017 - Valongo Wharf designated an UNESCO World Heritage Site.
 2018
 2 September: National Museum of Brazil fire

See also
 History of Rio de Janeiro
 List of mayors of Rio de Janeiro

Other cities in Brazil:
 Timeline of Brasília
 Timeline of Curitiba
 Timeline of Fortaleza
 Timeline of Manaus
 Timeline of Recife
 Timeline of Salvador, Bahia
 Timeline of São Paulo

References

Bibliography

Published in the 19th century
 
 
 
 
 

 

Published in the 20th century
 
 
  
 
 
 
 Mary C. Karasch, Slave Life in Rio de Janeiro, 1808-1850 (Princeton University Press, 1987)
 Jeffrey D. Needell, A Tropical Belle Epoque: Elite Culture and Society in Turn-of-the-Century Rio de Janeiro (Cambridge University Press, 1987)
 

Published in the 21st century

External links

 
 Map of Rio de Janeiro, 1928
 Map of Rio de Janeiro, 1982
 Digital Public Library of America. Items related to Rio de Janeiro, various dates.
 

Rio de Janeiro
Rio de Janeiro
Rio de Janeiro